Sir Michael Scudamore Redgrave CBE (20 March 1908 – 21 March 1985) was an English stage and film actor, director, manager and author. He received a nomination for the Academy Award for Best Actor for his performance in Mourning Becomes Electra (1947), as well as two BAFTA nominations for Best British Actor for his performances in The Night My Number Came Up (1955) and Time Without Pity (1957).

At the 4th Cannes Film Festival, he won Best Actor for his performance in The Browning Version (1951).

Youth and education
Redgrave was born in Bristol, England, the son of actress Margaret Scudamore and the silent film actor Roy Redgrave. Roy left when Redgrave was six months old to pursue a career in Australia. He died when Redgrave was 14. His mother subsequently married Captain James Anderson, a tea planter. Redgrave greatly disliked his stepfather.

He studied at Clifton College and Magdalene College, Cambridge. Clifton College Theatre was opened in 1966 by Redgrave and the first purpose-built school theatre in the country. After his death in 1985, the building was renamed The Redgrave Theatre in his honour.

He was a schoolmaster at Cranleigh School in Surrey before becoming an actor in 1934. He directed the boys in Hamlet, King Lear and The Tempest, but played all the leading roles himself. The Redgrave Theatre Society at the school was named after him. In the new Guildford School of Acting building, which opened in January 2010, the Sir Michael Redgrave Studio was named for him.

Theatre career
Redgrave made his first professional appearance at the Playhouse in Liverpool on 30 August 1934 as Roy Darwin in Counsellor-at-Law (by Elmer Rice), then spent two years with its Liverpool Repertory Company where he met his future wife Rachel Kempson. They married on 18 July 1935.

1930s
Offered a job by Tyrone Guthrie, Redgrave made his professional debut in London at the Old Vic on 14 September 1936, playing Ferdinand in Love's Labours Lost. During 1936–37 he also played Mr Horner in The Country Wife, Orlando in As You Like It, Warbeck in The Witch of Edmonton and Laertes to Laurence Olivier's Hamlet. His hit of the season was Orlando. Edith Evans was his Rosalind and the two fell very much in love. As he later explained: "Edith always had a habit of falling in love with her leading men; with us it just went rather further." As You Like It transferred to the New Theatre in February 1937 and Redgrave again played Orlando.

At the Embassy Theatre in March 1937, he played Anderson in a mystery play, The Bat, before returning to the Old Vic in April, succeeding Marius Goring as Chorus in Henry V. Other roles that year included Christopher Drew in Daisy Fisher's comedy A Ship Comes Home at the St Martin's Theatre in May and Larry Starr in Philip Leaver's comedy Three Set Out at the Embassy in June, before joining John Gielgud's Company at the Queen's Theatre, September 1937 to April 1938, where he played Bolingbroke in Richard II, Charles Surface in The School for Scandal and Baron Tusenbach in Three Sisters.

Other roles included:
Alexei Turbin in The White Guard (The Days of the Turbins by Mikhail Bulgakov), Phoenix Theatre October 1938
Sir Andrew Aguecheek in Twelfth Night, Phoenix December 1938
Harry, Lord Monchesney in The Family Reunion (T.S. Eliot), Westminster Theatre March 1939
Henry in Springtime for Henry, touring 1939

World War II
Once the London theatres were re-opened, after the outbreak of war, he played:
Captain Macheath in The Beggar's Opera, Theatre Royal, Haymarket, March 1940
Charleston in Thunder Rock, by Robert Ardrey, Neighbourhood Theatre June 1940; Globe Theatre July 1940. (He would reprise this role in the 1942 Boulting Brothers film version.)

Redgrave joined the Royal Navy as an ordinary seaman in July 1941, but was discharged on medical grounds in November 1942. Having spent most of 1942 in the Reserve he managed to direct Lifeline (Norman Armstrong) starring Frank Pettingell at the Duchess Theatre in July; and The Duke in Darkness (Patrick Hamilton) starring Leslie Banks at the St James's Theatre in October, also taking the role of Gribaud.

Resuming his stage career he played/directed:
Rakitin in A Month in the Country (Turgenev), St James's Theatre March 1943
Lafont in six matinees of Parisienne, a comedy by Henry Becque, translated by Ashley Dukes, (Redgrave also directed and managed) co-starring Sonia Dresdel, St James's Theatre June 1943
Blow Your Own Trumpet, a comedy by Peter Ustinov, (directed), Playhouse Theatre August 1943
The Wingless Victory, a period romance by Maxwell Anderson, (directed) starring Rachel Kempson as Faith Ingalls, Phoenix Theatre September 1943
Harry Quincey in Uncle Harry, a thriller by Thomas Job, (also co-directed with William Armstrong) with Beatrix Lehmann as Leslie Quincey and Rachel Kempson as Lucy Forrest, Garrick Theatre March 1944
Colonel Stjerbinsky in Jacobowsky and the Colonel, a comedy by Franz Werfel, adapted by S.N. Behrman, (Redgrave also directed) with Rachel Kempson as Marianne, Piccadilly Theatre, June 1945

Post-war years
Title role in Macbeth, Aldwych Theatre December 1947; National Theatre, New York City (NYC debut, with Flora Robson as Lady Macbeth) 31 March 1948
Captain in The Father (August Strindberg) directed by Dennis Arundell with Freda Jackson as Laura, Embassy Theatre November 1948; and Duchess Theatre January 1949
Etienne in A Woman in Love (also co-adapted with Diana Gould and directed) with Margaret Rawlings as Germaine, Embassy April 1949

Joining the Old Vic Company at the New Theatre for its 1949–50 season, he played:
Berowne in Love's Labours Lost
Marlow in She Stoops to Conquer
Rakitin in A Month in the Country
His first Hamlet, which he also played at the Zürich Festival, the Holland Festival and at Kronborg Castle in Elsinore, June 1950

1950s
Redgrave joined the Shakespeare Memorial Theatre company at Stratford-upon-Avon and for the 1951 season appeared as Prospero in The Tempest as well as playing Richard II, Hotspur and Chorus in the Cycle of Histories, for which he also directed Henry IV Part Two. After appearing as Frank Elgin in Winter Journey at the St James's April 1952, he rejoined the Stratford company in 1953 (together with his actress wife Rachel Kempson) appearing as Shylock, King Lear and Antony in Antony and Cleopatra, also playing Antony when the company transferred to the Prince's Theatre in November 1953 before touring in the Netherlands, Belgium and Paris, in 1958 he played Hamlet with Googie Withers appearing as his mother at Stratford on Avon.

At the Apollo in June 1955 he played Hector in Tiger at the Gates, appearing in the same role at the Plymouth Theatre, New York City in October 1955 for which he received the New York Critics' Award. While in New York he directed A Month in the Country at the Phoenix Theatre in April 1956, and directed and played the Prince Regent in The Sleeping Prince with Barbara Bel Geddes at the Coronet Theatre in November 1956.

Returning to London in January 1958, Redgrave appeared as Philip Lester in A Touch of the Sun (N. C. Hunter) at the Saville Theatre. He won Best Actor in the Evening Standard Awards 1958 for this role. He rejoined the Shakespeare Memorial Theatre Company in June 1958, to play Hamlet and Benedick, also playing Hamlet with the company in Leningrad and Moscow in December 1958. (His wife Rachel Kempson played Ursula in Much Ado About Nothing and Lady Capulet in Romeo and Juliet).

At the Queen's Theatre, in London in August 1959, he played H.J. in his own adaptation of the Henry James novella The Aspern Papers. His play was later successfully revived on Broadway in 1962, with Dame Wendy Hiller and Maurice Evans. The 1984 London revival featured his daughter, Vanessa Redgrave, along with Christopher Reeve and Hiller, this time in the role of Miss Bordereau.

1960s
Roles included:
Jack Dean in The Tiger and the Horse by Robert Bolt (which Redgrave also co-presented, directed by Frith Banbury), Queen's Theatre, August 1960
Victor Rhodes in The Complaisant Lover by Graham Greene, Ethel Barrymore Theatre, New York, November 1961 – 101 performances

Returning to the UK, in July 1962 he took part in the Chichester Festival Theatre's opening season, playing the title role in Chekhov's Uncle Vanya to the Astrov of Laurence Olivier who also directed.

Alongside John Dexter's Chichester staging of Saint Joan, Olivier's Uncle Vanya was first revived in Chichester in 1963 before transferring to the Old Vic as part of the nascent Royal National Theatre's inaugural season, winning rave reviews and Redgrave's second win as Best Actor in the 1963 Evening Standard Awards. Critic Michael Billington recalled: "In Redgrave's Vanya you saw both a tremulous victim of a lifetime's emotional repression and the wasted potential of a Chekhovian might-have-been: as Redgrave and Olivier took their joint curtain call, linked hands held triumphantly aloft, we were not to know that this was to symbolise the end of their artistic amity."

Redgrave played (and co-presented) Lancelot Dodd MA in Arthur Watkyn's Out of Bounds at Wyndham's Theatre in November 1962, following it at the Old Vic with his portrayal of Claudius opposite the Hamlet of Peter O'Toole on 22 October 1963. This Hamlet was in fact the National Theatre's official opening production, directed by Olivier, but Simon Callow has dubbed it "slow, solemn, long", while Ken Campbell vividly described it as "brochure theatre."

In January 1964 at the National he played the title role in Hobson's Choice, which he admitted was well outside his range: "I couldn't do the Lancashire accent and that shook my nerve terribly – all the other performances suffered." While still at the National in June 1964 he also played Halvard Solness in The Master Builder, which he said 'went wrong'. At this time he had incipient Parkinson's disease, although he did not know it.

In May and June 1965 Redgrave directed the opening festival of the Yvonne Arnaud Theatre in Guildford, including directing and playing Rakitin in A Month in the Country (co-starring with Ingrid Bergman as Natalya Petrovna), and Samson in Samson Agonistes (co-starring with Rachel Kempson as Chorus). He again played Rakitin in September 1965, when his production transferred to the Cambridge Theatre in London. For the Glyndebourne Festival Opera he directed Werther in 1966 and La bohème in 1967.

1970s
At the Mermaid Theatre in July 1971 he played Mr Jaraby in The Old Boys (William Trevor) and had an unfortunate experience: "My memory went, and on the first night they made me wear a deaf aid to hear some lines from the prompter and it literally fell to pieces – there were little bits of machinery all over the floor, so I then knew I really couldn't go on, at least not learning new plays."

Nevertheless, he successfully took over the part of Father in John Mortimer's A Voyage Round My Father at the Theatre Royal, Haymarket, also touring Canada and Australia in the role in 1972–73.

In 1973, he played a supporting role in David Winters' musical television film adaptation of Dr. Jekyll and Mr. Hyde, starring Kirk Douglas.

He returned to the international touring of A Voyage Round My Father in 1974–75 with a Royal Shakespeare Company production of The Hollow Crown, visiting major venues in the US, New Zealand and Australia, while in 1976–77 he toured South America, Canada, the UK and the United States in the anthology, Shakespeare's People.

Redgrave's final theatre appearance came in May 1979 when he portrayed Jasper in Simon Gray's Close of Play, directed on the Lyttelton stage at the National Theatre by Harold Pinter. It was a silent, seated role, based on Gray's own father, who had died a year before he wrote the play. As Gray has said: "Jasper is in fact dead but is forced to endure, as if alive, a traditional English Sunday, helpless in his favourite armchair as his three sons and their wives fall to pieces in the usual English middle class style, sometimes blaming him, sometimes appealing to him for help and sobbing at his feet for forgiveness, but basically ignoring him. In other words I had stuck him in Hell, which turns out to be 'life, old life itself'."

His final work, in 1975, a narrative of the epic poem, The Rime of the Ancient Mariner, by Samuel Taylor Coleridge, a poem that Redgrave taught as a young schoolmaster and visualised by producer-director Raul da Silva, received six international film festival prizes of which five were first place in category. This work was to be his last before the onslaught of Parkinson's disease.

Film and television work
Redgrave first appeared on BBC television at the Alexandra Palace in 1937, in scenes from Romeo and Juliet. His first major film role was in Alfred Hitchcock's The Lady Vanishes (1938). Redgrave also starred in The Stars Look Down (1940), with James Mason in the film of Robert Ardrey's play Thunder Rock (1942), and in the ventriloquist's dummy episode of the Ealing compendium film Dead of Night (1945).

His first American film role was opposite Rosalind Russell in Mourning Becomes Electra (1947), for which he was nominated for an Academy Award for Best Actor. In 1951 he starred in The Browning Version, from Sir Terrence Rattigan's play of the same name. The Daily Mirror described Redgrave's performance as Crocker-Harris as "one of the greatest performances ever seen in films". The 1950s also saw Redgrave in The Importance of Being Earnest (1952), The Dambusters (1954) with his portrayal of the inventor Barnes Wallis, 1984 (1956), Time Without Pity (1957), for which he was nominated for a BAFTA Award, and The Quiet American (1958).

Notable television performances include narration for The Great War (1964), a history of World War I using stills and 'stretched' archive film, and the less successful Lost Peace series (BBC Television, 1964 and 1966). Of the latter, Philip Purser wrote: "The commentary, spoken by Sir Michael Redgrave, took on an unremittingly pessimistic tone from the outset."

Personal life

Family

Redgrave was married to the actress Rachel Kempson for 50 years from 1935 until his death. Their children Vanessa (b. 1937), Corin (1939–2010) and Lynn Redgrave (1943–2010), and their grandchildren: Natasha Richardson (1963–2009), Joely Richardson (b. 1965) and Jemma Redgrave (b. 1965) are also involved in theatre or film as actors. Their grandson Carlo Gabriel Nero is a screenwriter and film director; only Luke Redgrave has taken a path outside the theatre.

His daughter Lynn wrote a one-woman play for herself called Shakespeare for My Father. She was nominated for Broadway's Tony Award for this role. She traced her love for Shakespeare as a way of following and finding her often absent father.

Redgrave owned White Roding Windmill from 1937 to 1946. He and his family lived in Bedford House on Chiswick Mall from 1945 to 1954. His entry for Who's Who in the Theatre (1981) gives his address as Wilks Water, Odiham, Hampshire.

Bisexuality
Corin helped his father in the writing of his last autobiography. During one of Corin's visits to his father, the latter said, "There is something I ought to tell you". Then, after a long pause, "I am, to say the least of it, bisexual". Corin encouraged him to acknowledge his bisexuality in the book. Redgrave agreed to do so, but in the end he chose to remain silent about it. Alan Strachan's 2004 biography of Redgrave discusses his affairs with both men and women. Although Redgrave had some long-term relationships with men, he also was prone to cruising Victoria or Knightsbridge for what he called "a necessary degradation", a habit of quick pick-ups that left him with a lasting sense of self-disgust.

The 1996 BBC documentary film Michael Redgrave: My Father, narrated by Corin Redgrave, and based on his book of the same name, discusses his father's bisexuality in some depth. Rachel Kempson recounted that when she proposed to him, Redgrave said that there were "difficulties to do with his nature, and that he felt he ought not to marry". She said that she understood, it did not matter and that she loved him. To this, Redgrave replied, "Very well. If you're sure, we will".

During the filming of Fritz Lang's Secret Beyond the Door (1948), Redgrave met Bob Michell, and they soon became lovers. Michell set up house close to the Redgraves, and he became a surrogate "uncle" to Redgrave's children (then aged 11, 9 and 5), who adored him. Michell later had children of his own, including a son he named Michael. Fred Sadoff was an actor/director who became Redgrave's assistant and lover; they shared lodgings in New York and London.

A card was found among Redgrave's effects after his death. The card was signed "Tommy, Liverpool, January 1940", and on it were the words (quoted from W.H. Auden): "The word is love. Surely one fearless kiss would cure the million fevers".

Illness and death
In 1976, after suffering symptoms for many years, Redgrave was diagnosed with rapidly advancing Parkinson's disease. He began a regimen of therapies and medications that caused disorientation and other side effects. Costs for his healthcare expenses and his diminished earning power caused the family to apply for public assistance from the King George's Pension Fund. In an interview on his 70th birthday, he said: "For a long time, nobody understood the Parkinson's condition, and directors thought I was just forgetful or drunk--and even now the work isn't easy. The difficulty is not just remembering lines but getting from place to place."

Redgrave died in a nursing home in Denham, Buckinghamshire, on 21 March 1985, from Parkinson's disease, the day after his 77th birthday. He was cremated at Mortlake Crematorium and his ashes were scattered in the garden of St Paul's, Covent Garden (The Actors’ Church), London.

Awards
In 1951 Redgrave received the Best Actor Award (Cannes Film Festival) for The Browning Version. He won Best Actor trophies in 1958 and 1963 Evening Standard Awards and received the Variety Club of Great Britain 'Actor of the Year' award in the same years.

Honours
Redgrave was appointed Commander of the Order of the British Empire (CBE) by the Queen in 1952 and knighted in 1959. He was appointed Commander of the Order of the Dannebrog by Denmark in 1955.

Appointments
Redgrave became the First President of the English Speaking Board in 1953, and President of the Questors Theatre, Ealing in 1958. In 1966, he received an honorary DLitt degree from the University of Bristol.

In 1986, he was inducted posthumously into the American Theater Hall of Fame.

Redgrave Theatre
The Redgrave Theatre in Farnham, Surrey, 1974–1998, was named in his honour.

Box office ranking
For a number of years, British film exhibitors voted him among the top ten British stars at the box office via an annual poll in the Motion Picture Herald.

 1946: 4th
 1951: 9th

Filmography

Film

Radio appearances

Theatre

Writings
Redgrave wrote five books:

 Water Music for a Botanist W. Heffer, Cambridge (1929) Poem
 The Actor's Ways and Means Heinemann (1953)
 Mask or Face: Reflections in an Actor's Mirror Heinemann (1958)
 The Mountebank's Tale Heinemann (1959)
 In My Mind's I: An Actor's Autobiography Viking (1983) 

His plays include The Seventh Man and Circus Boy, both performed at the Liverpool Playhouse in 1935, and his adaptations of A Woman in Love (Amourese) at the Embassy Theatre in 1949 and the Henry James novella The Aspern Papers at the Queen's Theatre, in 1959.

References

Further reading
 Who's Who in the Theatre 17th edition, Gale (1981) 
 Theatre Record and its annual Indexes
 The Great Stage Stars by Sheridan Morley, Angus & Robertson (1986)

External links
 
 
 
 
 The Sir Michael Redgrave Archive is held by the Victoria and Albert Museum Theatre and Performance Department.

1908 births
1985 deaths
English male film actors
English male stage actors
20th-century English male actors
Actors awarded knighthoods
Male actors from Bristol
Alumni of Magdalene College, Cambridge
Bisexual male actors
Deaths from Parkinson's disease
English LGBT actors
Neurological disease deaths in England
Knights Bachelor
People educated at Clifton College
English male Shakespearean actors
Cannes Film Festival Award for Best Actor winners
Commanders of the Order of the British Empire
Redgrave family
Royal Navy personnel of World War II
Royal Navy sailors
20th-century English LGBT people
Military personnel from Bristol